Ramnagar (or Ram Nagar) is a village in the southeastern part of North Andaman Island. It belongs to the Diglipur county, Andaman and Nicobar territory of India.  It has a population of about 1400 people.

The village lies about 18 km south of Diglipur and 7.5 km south of Saddle Peak, the highest point of North Andaman. It is a major tourist destination in North Andaman, for being next to Taralait Bay and the Ram Nagar Beach, and the nearest village to Chalis Ek and Alfred caves.

References

Villages in North and Middle Andaman district